Dioscorea alata, also known as purple yam, ube, or greater yam, among many other names, is a species of yam (a tuber). The tubers are usually a vivid violet-purple to bright lavender in color (hence the common name), but some range in color from cream to plain white. It is sometimes confused with taro and the Okinawa sweet potato (Ipomoea batatas cv. With its origins in the Asian tropics, D. alata has been known to humans since ancient times.

Names
Because it has become naturalized following its origins in Asia, specifically the Philippines, through tropical South America, and the southeastern U.S., D. alata is referred to by many different names in these regions. In English alone, aside from purple yam, other common names include ten-months yam, water yam, white yam, winged yam, violet yam, Guyana arrowroot, or simply yam.

History of cultivation

Dioscorea alata is one of the most important staple crops in Austronesian cultures. It is one of various species of yams that were domesticated and cultivated independently within the Philippines for their starchy tubers, including the round yam (Dioscorea bulbifera), ubi gadong (Dioscorea hispida), lesser yam (Dioscorea esculenta), Pacific yam (Dioscorea nummularia), fiveleaf yam (Dioscorea pentaphylla), and pencil yam (Dioscorea transversa). Among these, D. alata and D. esculenta were the only ones regularly cultivated and eaten, while the rest were usually considered as famine food due to their higher levels of the toxin dioscorine which requires that they be prepared correctly before consumption. D. alata is also cultivated more than D. esculenta, largely because of its much larger tubers.

D. alata and D. esculenta were the most suitable for long transport in Austronesian ships and were carried through all or most of the range of the Austronesian expansion. D. alata in particular were introduced into the Pacific Islands and New Zealand. They were also carried by Austronesian voyagers into Madagascar and the Comoros.

The center of origin of purple yam is unknown, but archaeological evidence suggests that it was exploited in Island Southeast Asia and New Guinea before the Austronesian expansion. Purple yam is believed to be a true cultigen, only known from its cultivated forms. The vast majority of cultivars are sterile, which restricts its introduction into islands purely by human agency, making them a good indicator of human movement. Some authors have proposed, without evidence, an origin in Mainland Southeast Asia, but it shows the greatest phenotypic variability in the Philippines. 

There is also evidence of an agricultural revolution during this period brought by innovations from contact with Austronesians, including the development of wet cultivation. However, much older remains identified as being probably D. alata have also been recovered from the Niah Caves of Borneo  (Late Pleistocene, <40,000 BP) and the Ille Cave of Palawan (c. 11,000 BP), along with remains of the toxic ubi gadong (D. hispida) which requires processing before it can be edible. Although it doesn't prove cultivation, it does show that humans already had the knowledge to exploit starchy plants and that D. alata were native to Island Southeast Asia. Furthermore, it opens the question on whether D. alata is a true species or cultivated much older than believed.

Purple yam remains an important crop in Southeast Asia, particularly in the Philippines where the vividly purple variety is widely used in various traditional and modern desserts. It also remains important in Melanesia, where it is also grown for ceremonial purposes tied to the size of the tubers at harvest time. Its importance in eastern Polynesia and New Zealand, however, has waned after the introduction of other crops, most notably the sweet potato.

Uses

Culinary
Purple yams have edible tubers which have a mildly sweet, earthy and nutty taste, reminiscent of sweet potatoes or taro. The violet cultivars, in particular, turn dishes distinctively vivid violet because of the high amount of anthocyanins. Purple yams are also valued for the starch that can be processed from them. 
Purple yam is most common in Philippine cuisine (where it is known as ube or ubi). It is widely applied for many Philippine desserts, such as ube cake, ube cheesecake and ube crinkles, as well as an ingredient or flavor for ice cream, milk, donuts, tarts, jam and other types of pastries. It is often eaten boiled, baked, or as a sweetened dessert called ube halayá; the latter being a popular ingredient in the iced dessert called halo-halo. Purple yam desserts have more recently entered the United States through Philippine cuisine, under the Filipino name "ube". It is particularly popular due to the striking violet-purple color it gives to desserts.

Purple yam is commonly confused with purple/violet varieties of sweet potatoes because of their similarities in color, taste, and culinary uses. However, like other yams, purple yam tends to have a moister texture than sweet potatoes. Purple yams also have higher anthocyanin content than sweet potatoes. They can otherwise be used interchangeably in most recipes.

Supplements, folk medicine and adverse effects
Although available as a dietary supplement and used in folk medicine, there is no clinical evidence that D. alata has any therapeutic properties. Use of D. alata supplements may have adverse effects in people taking estrogens, anticoagulant drugs or during pregnancy and breast-feeding. Some people may have allergic reactions to use of D. alata supplements.

D. alata has relatively high levels of oxalates (486–781 mg/100 g dry matter), which are associated with antinutritional effects and kidney stone formation.

Other uses
The color of purple varieties is due to various anthocyanin pigments. The pigments are water-soluble, and have been proposed as possible food coloring agents.

D. alata is sometimes grown in gardens for its ornamental value.

As an invasive species
Dioscorea alata is native to the Philippines, as well as surrounding areas (Taiwan and the Ryukyu Islands of Japan.  It has escaped from its native growth area and into the wild in many other places, becoming naturalized in parts of southern and east-central China, Africa and Madagascar, the Western Hemisphere, and various islands in the Indian and Pacific oceans. It persists in the wild in Haiti, as well as the United States, in Louisiana, Georgia, Alabama, Puerto Rico, the U.S. Virgin Islands, and in Florida where it is considered an invasive species.

See also
Domesticated plants and animals of Austronesia
Colocasia esculenta
Alocasia macrorrhizos
Amorphophallus paeoniifolius
Cyrtosperma merkusii
Ipomoea batatas

References

External links

Images from Forestry Images (webpages from the University of Georgia's Center for Invasive Species and Ecosystem Health)

alata
Plants described in 1753
Taxa named by Carl Linnaeus
Yams (vegetable)
Flora of tropical Asia
Maharashtrian cuisine
Philippine cuisine